Mesorhizobium thiogangeticum is a gram-negative, catalase-positive, oxidase-negative, aerobic, non-spore-forming rod-shaped bacteria from the genus Mesorhizobium which was isolated from soil near the roots of Clitoria ternatea from a Gangetic plains in India.

References

External links
Type strain of Mesorhizobium thiogangeticum at BacDive -  the Bacterial Diversity Metadatabase

Phyllobacteriaceae
Bacteria described in 2006